Pierre Labarelle (born 19 September 1982) is a French slalom canoeist who competed at the international level from 1999 to 2015. In the early part of his career he was specializing on the C1 class. He started competing in the C2 class in 2011 when he teamed up with Nicolas Peschier.

He won four gold medals at the ICF Canoe Slalom World Championships (C1 team: 2005, 2007; C2 team: 2011, 2014). He also won six medals at the European Championships (2 golds, 3 silvers and 1 bronze).

Labarelle won the overall World Cup title in the C2 class in 2012.

World Cup individual podiums

References

French male canoeists
Living people
Sportspeople from Mulhouse
1982 births
Medalists at the ICF Canoe Slalom World Championships
21st-century French people